Roland Glyn Mathias (4 September 1915 – 16 August 2007) was a Welsh writer, known for his poetry and short stories. He was also a literary critic, and responsible with Raymond Garlick for the success of the literary magazine Dock Leaves (from 1949), which later, from 1957, became The Anglo-Welsh Review. He edited it from 1961 to 1976. His other writing includes books on David Jones, Vernon Watkins and John Cowper Powys, and Anglo-Welsh Poetry 1480-1980 with Raymond Garlick.

Early life 
Mathias was born at Talybont-on-Usk, south-east of Brecon in Powys, in 1915 and brought up mostly in England and Germany. He graduated in history from Jesus College, Oxford. Days Enduring (1942) was his first poetry collection. He was a pacifist, and was twice gaoled in World War II as a conscientious objector. His career was in teaching, in Wales and elsewhere in the UK, notably serving as Headmaster of King Edward VI Five Ways School, Bartley Green, Birmingham from 1964 to 1969. He retired to Brecon in 1969 and died in 2007; buried at Aber Chapel on the outskirts of Talybont on Usk.

His son, Jonathan Glyn Mathias, known as Glyn Mathias, is a well known political correspondent.

Honours and awards 
The Roland Mathias Prize, a literary award, is administered by the Brecknock Society and Museum Friends and is named in his honour.

There are collections of manuscripts and correspondence of Roland Mathias and of The Anglo-Welsh Review in the National Library of Wales.

References

Publications
Roland Mathias (1995) by Sam Adams 
The Collected Poems of Roland Mathias (2002) (ed. Sam Adams) 
The Collected Short Stories of Roland Mathias (2001) (ed. Sam Adams

External links
The Independent: Roland Mathias Obituary

1915 births
2007 deaths
Welsh poets
Welsh short story writers
Welsh pacifists
Welsh conscientious objectors
Welsh Christian pacifists
Calvinist pacifists
Alumni of Jesus College, Oxford
People from Powys